INSS may refer to:

 Institute for National Security Studies (Israel), Israeli research institute and think tank
 Nicaraguan Social Security Institute, Nicaraguan government agency